The Haskell Stakes is a Grade I American Thoroughbred horse race for three-year-olds run over a distance of  miles on the dirt held annually in July at Monmouth Park Racetrack in Oceanport, New Jersey. The event is a signature event at Monmouth Park during their summer racing season and a major race for three-year-olds in between the U.S. Triple Crown series and the Breeders' Cup. The event currently offers a purse of US$1,000,000 and awards one of the most prestigious trophies in U.S. thoroughbred racing in the Haskell Trophy.

History

The inaugural running of the event was on 3 August 1968, closing day of the Monmouth Park summer meeting, as the Monmouth Invitational Handicap with a field of eleven horses. The event was won by 33-1 longshot Balustrade ridden by Canadian jockey Eric Walsh in a time of 1:50 flat with the favorite Iron Ruler finishing fourth.

In 1973 when The American Graded Stakes Committee was founded by the Thoroughbred Owners and Breeders Association with the event attracting high quality entrants the Monmouth Invitational Handicap immediately was given the highest classification of Grade I.

In the 1976 running of the event Majestic Light set a new track record of 1:47 flat winning by six lengths. The track record was broken by Spend A Buck in 1985. In 1987 Belmont Stakes winner Bet Twice won the event and equaled the stakes mark.

In 1981, the board of directors of Monmouth Park Racetrack switched the names of the Amory L. Haskell Handicap with this event giving the name Haskell Invitational Handicap. Amory L. Haskell (1893–1966) was the former president and chairman of Monmouth Park.

In 1997, the purse for the race was increased to $1,000,000 and has since remained at that level with two exceptions. In 2006, the event was changed from a handicap to allowance weight conditions and the name of the event was modified to the Haskell Invitational Stakes. In 2002, the purse was increased to $1,500,000 due to the presence of War Emblem, winner of the Kentucky Derby and Preakness Stakes. In 2015, the purse was increased to $1,750,000 as it featured American Pharoah in his first race since winning the Triple Crown. The 2015 running attracted a record New Jersey crowd of 60,983.

In 2020 the event ceased to be an Invitational and the name was changed to simply the Haskell Stakes.

The event has attracted many sponsors including Buick (1996−1998), Izod (2010), William Hill (2013−2015), betfair.com (2016−2018) and TVG.com (2019– ).

Eleven winners of the Haskell have gone on to win championship honors at the Eclipse Awards as best three-year-old colt or filly. Five have also been named horse of the year in the year they won the Haskell. They are:
 Champion three-year-old colts: Wajima (1975), Holy Bull (1994), Skip Away (1996), Point Given (2001), War Emblem (2002), Big Brown (2008), Lookin at Lucky (2010), American Pharoah (2015), Authentic (2020)
 Champion three-year-old fillies: Serena's Song (1995), Rachel Alexandra (2009)
 Horses of the Year: Holy Bull (1994), Point Given (2001), Rachel Alexandra (2009), American Pharoah (2015), Authentic (2020)

Records
Stakes record
1:46.24 – Cyberknife (2022)

Largest winning margin
 lengths – Verrazano (2013)

Most wins by a jockey:
 3 – Craig Perret (1981, 1987, 1991)
 3 – Martin Garcia (2010, 2011, 2014)
 3 – Mike E. Smith (1994, 1998, 2020)

Most wins by a trainer:
 9 – Bob Baffert (2001, 2002, 2005, 2010, 2011, 2012, 2014, 2015, 2020)

Most wins by an owner:
 2 – The Thoroughbred Corporation (2001, 2002)
 2 – WinStar Farm (2006, 2007)
 2 – Stonerside Stable  (1998, 2009)
 2 – Michael Pegram, Karl Watson &  Paul Weitman  (2010, 2011)
 2 – Zayat Stables (2012, 2015)

Winners

Notes:

ƒ Filly or Mare

† In the 2021 running Hot Rod Charlie was first past the winning post but was disqualified and placed seventh (last) for interfering in the stretch run clipping Midnight Bourbon who dislodged his rider Paco Lopez.

See also
 List of American and Canadian Graded races

References

Graded stakes races in the United States
Grade 1 stakes races in the United States
Horse races in New Jersey
Flat horse races for three-year-olds
Recurring sporting events established in 1968
Monmouth Park Racetrack
1968 establishments in New Jersey